The 1972 Illinois gubernatorial election was held in Illinois on November 7, 1972. Incumbent first-term Republican governor Richard B. Ogilvie lost reelection in an upset to the Democratic nominee, Dan Walker.

This was the first election in which each party's nominee for lieutenant governor of Illinois ran on a ticket with the gubernatorial nominee for the general election. Previously, there had been two separate elections for the two offices. This would be the last election of the 20th century in which a Democrat won the governorship of Illinois, with all seven remaining elections of that century being won by Republican nominees.

Election information
This was the first gubernatorial elections in which gubernatorial and lieutenant gubernatorial candidates were elected on a ticket in the general election, per the 1970 Constitution of Illinois.

The election coincided with those for federal offices (United States President, Senate, and House) and those for other state offices. The election was part of the 1972 Illinois elections. Walker was the last Democrat to be elected governor of Illinois until Rod Blagojevich in 2002.

The primaries were held on March 21, 1972.

Turnout
Turnout in the primaries saw 36.09% in the gubernatorial primaries, with a total of 2,015,694 votes cast, and 30.46% in the lieutenant gubernatorial primary, with 1,701,418 votes cast.

Turnout during the general election was 75.28%, with 4,679,043 votes cast.

Democratic primaries

Governor

In an upset, Dan Walker won a close primary against then-Lt. Governor Paul Simon. Paul Simon had been the candidate slated by the state party.

Lieutenant Governor
Neil Hartigan, the candidate slated by the state party, defeated Carbondale mayor Neal Eckert, Walker's declared preferred running-mate.

Republican primary

Governor
Ogilvie won renomination easily. His main rival, John M. Mathis was a favorite son of the Peoria area, and fared poorly elsewhere.

Lieutenant Governor
James D. Nowlan won the Republican primary for Lieutenant Governor, running unopposed.

General election

References

1972
Gubernatorial
Illinois